The 2018 FIBA Polynesian Basketball Cup was an international basketball tournament contested by national teams of the newly formed Polynesia sub-zone of FIBA Oceania. The inaugural edition of the tournament was hosted by Samoa from 19 to 24 November 2018. Matches were played at the NUS Gymnasium.

The tournament serves as qualifiers for the basketball events of the 2019 Pacific Games in Samoa with three berths for Polynesia allocated for the top three teams,  excluding , in this tournament.

 swept its way throughout the tournament, sweeping the preliminaries and won their first-ever Polynesian Cup championship over the hosts  in the Final, 77-73.

Teams
 

 (Hosts)

Preliminary round

Final round

Third place game

Final

Final standings

Awards

 Most Valuable Player:  Ariirimarau Meuel

 All-Star Team:
 PG –  Marcus Alipate
 SG –  Sapeti Tufuga
 SF –  Ariirimarau Meuel
 PF –  Theodore McFarland
 C  –  Reihiti Sommers

See also 
 2017 FIBA Melanesia Basketball Cup
 2018 FIBA Women's Polynesia Basketball Cup
 Basketball at the 2018 Micronesian Games
 Basketball at the 2019 Pacific Games

References

Polynesian Cup